The following is a list of notable deaths in January 2010.

Entries for each day are listed alphabetically by surname. A typical entry lists information in the following sequence:
 Name, age, country of citizenship at birth, subsequent country of citizenship (if applicable), reason for notability, cause of death (if known), and reference.

January 2010

1
Gary Brockette, 62, American actor (The Last Picture Show) and assistant director, cancer.
Chauncey H. Browning, Jr., 75, American politician, West Virginia Attorney General (1969–1985).
Jean Carroll, 98, American comedian (The Ed Sullivan Show).
Periyasamy Chandrasekaran, 52, Sri Lankan politician, Member of Parliament, after short illness.
Lhasa de Sela, 37, American singer, breast cancer.
Michael Dwyer, 58, Irish journalist and film critic, lung cancer.
*Alfredo Mario Espósito Castro, 82, Argentinian Roman Catholic Bishop of Zárate-Campana (1976–1991).
John Freeman, 93, American animator (The Smurfs) and animation director (My Little Pony and Friends).
Bingo Gazingo, 85, American performance poet, struck by car.
Adrien Gilbert, 78, Canadian Olympic weightlifter
Richard Kindleberger, 67, American newspaper reporter (The Boston Globe), brain tumor.
John Lyon, 58, British cricketer.
Jack Middleton, 92, British Olympic swimmer.
Tetsuo Narikawa, 65, Japanese actor (Spectreman) and karate instructor, lung cancer.
Marlene Neubauer-Woerner, 91, German sculptor.
Libuše Patočková, 76, Czech Olympic cross-country skier.
Stanisław Przybylski, 79, Polish modern pentathlete.
Mohamed Rahmat, 71, Malaysian politician, Information Minister (1978–1982, 1987–1999).
Faisal Bin Shamlan, 75, Yemeni politician, presidential candidate (2006), cancer.
Billy Arjan Singh, 92, Indian author.
Gregory Slay, 40, American rock drummer (Remy Zero), songwriter (Nip/Tuck theme), cystic fibrosis.
Freya von Moltke, 98, German World War II resistance fighter.
John Shelton Wilder, 88, American politician, Lieutenant Governor of Tennessee (1971–2007), stroke.

2
Johann Frank, 71, Austrian football player (FK Austria Wien).
David Gerber, 86, American executive producer (Police Story, Police Woman), heart failure.
William Green, 82, British aviation writer.
Deborah Howell, 68, American journalist, The Washington Post ombudsman, hit by car.
René Oreel, 87, Belgian cyclist.
Augustine Paul, 65, Malaysian Federal Court judge, after chronic illness.
David R. Ross, 51, Scottish historian, heart attack.
Rajendra Shah, 96, Indian poet.

3
Gus Alexander, 75, Scottish footballer (Workington).
Gustavo Becerra-Schmidt, 84, Chilean composer, lung cancer.
Margery Beddow, 72, American choreographer and dancer.
Barry Blair, 56, Canadian comics artist and writer, brain aneurysm.
Gianni Bonichon, 65, Italian bobsledder, Olympic silver medalist.
Otto Breg, 60, Austrian Olympic bobsledder.
Sir Ian Brownlie, 77, British barrister, traffic collision.
Joyce Collins, 79, American jazz singer and pianist, pulmonary fibrosis.
Mary Daly, 81, American radical feminist philosopher.
Francis Gillingham, 93, British neurosurgeon.
Ali Safi Golpaygani, 96, Iranian Marja', natural causes.
Billy Harris, 58, American basketball player (Northern Illinois Huskies, San Diego Conquistadors), stroke.
John Keith Irwin, 80, American sociologist.
Eunice W. Johnson, 93, American director of Ebony Fashion Fair, widow of John H. Johnson, renal failure.
Charles Kleibacker, 88, American fashion designer, pneumonia.
Georges Martin, 94, French cyclist.
Takis Michalos, 63, Greek Greece men's national water polo team water polo player and coach; cancer.
Moti Nandi, 79, Indian writer and sports journalist.
Geoffrey Reeve, 77, British film director.
Isak Rogde, 62, Norwegian translator.
Tibet, 78, French comics artist and writer.
Bobby Wilkins, 87, American baseball player (Philadelphia Athletics).

4
Olaug Abrahamsen, 81, Norwegian politician.
Rosalie Abrams, 88, American feminist playwright, actress and activist, Alzheimer's disease.
Paul Ahyi, 79, Togolese artist, designer of the flag of Togo.
Lew Allen, 84, American USAF general, NSA Director (1973–1977), USAF Chief of Staff (1978–1982), rheumatoid arthritis.
Knox Burger, 87, American editor, writer, and literary agent.
Neil Christian, 66, British singer, cancer.
Tony Clarke, 68, British musician and record producer (The Moody Blues), emphysema.
Sandro de América, 64, Argentinian singer, complications from heart and lung transplant surgery.
Donal Donnelly, 78, English-born Irish actor, cancer
Hywel Teifi Edwards, 75, Welsh historian and writer, after short illness.
Johan Ferrier, 99, Surinamese politician, President (1975–1980).
Tadeusz Góra, 91, Polish pilot.
Rory Markas, 54, American baseball radio announcer (Los Angeles Angels of Anaheim), heart attack.
György Mitró, 79, Hungarian Olympic swimmer.
Ludwig Wilding, 82, German artist.
Tsutomu Yamaguchi, 93, Japanese survivor of Hiroshima and Nagasaki atomic bombings, stomach cancer.

5
Abdul Azim al-Deeb, 80, Qatari professor (Qatar University).
Beverly Aadland, 67, American actress, girlfriend of Errol Flynn, diabetes and heart failure.
Daniel Kubert, 62, American mathematician.
Bernard Le Nail, 63, French writer, historian, Breton language and cultural advocate, cerebral hemorrhage.
Willie Mitchell, 81, American musician and record producer, cardiac arrest.
Kenneth Noland, 85, American color field painter, kidney cancer.
Courage Quashigah, 62, Ghanaian politician.
Philippa Scott, 91, British conservationist.
George Syrimis, 88, Cypriot finance minister (1988–1993).
Toni Tecuceanu, 37, Romanian comedy actor, bacterial infection.
Rolf Thieme, 65, German Olympic hockey player.
George Willoughby, 95, American Quaker activist.

6
Philippe Arthuys, 81, French composer and film director.
David Giles, 83, British television director.
Michael Goulder, 82, British biblical scholar.
Michael Harper, 78, British priest of the Church of England and later of the Antiochian Orthodox Church.
George Leonard, 86, American writer, editor and educator, pioneer of the Human Potential Movement, after long illness.
Graham Leonard, 88, British Church of England Bishop of London (1981–1991), subsequently a Roman Catholic priest.
Ivan Medek, 84, Czech music publicist, theorist and critic, collaborator of Václav Talich and Václav Havel.
Harriet Miller, 90, American politician, mayor of Santa Barbara, California (1995–2001).
Beniamino Placido, 80, Italian journalist and television critic.
Hervé Prouzet, 89, French cyclist
Kittu Suresh, 64, Indian cricketer.

7
Wendall Anschutz, 71, American television newsman.
Myrtle Aydelotte, 92, American nurse, professor and hospital administrator.
Sándor Barcs, 97, Hungarian politician and sport executive, interim President of UEFA (1972–1973).
Gerald Bordelon, 47, American convicted murderer, execution by lethal injection.
Alexander Garnet Brown, 79, Canadian politician, member of the Nova Scotia House of Assembly (1969–1978).
Bruria Kaufman, 91, Israeli physicist.
Stephen Huneck, 61, American wood carving artist, suicide by gunshot.
Kamal Mahsud, Pakistani Pashto language folk singer, gas leak.
Alex Parker, 74, Scottish football player (Falkirk, Everton, Southport, Scotland) and manager, heart attack.
Donald Edmond Pelotte, 64, American Roman Catholic Bishop of Gallup (1990–2008), first Native American bishop.
James D Robertson, 78, Scottish painter and lecturer.
Blanca Sánchez, 63, Mexican actress, kidney failure.
Philippe Séguin, 66, French politician, heart attack.
Jim White, 67, American professional wrestler, cancer.
Hardy Williams, 78, American politician, Pennsylvania State Senator (1983–1998), Alzheimer's disease.

8
Bob Blackburn, 85, American sports commentator (Seattle SuperSonics), pneumonia.
Jean Charpentier, 74, Canadian journalist, press secretary for Prime Minister Pierre Trudeau, cancer.
Art Clokey, 88, American stop motion animator (Gumby, Davey and Goliath), bladder infection.
Piero De Bernardi, 83, Italian screenwriter.
Tony Halme, 47, Finnish professional boxer, actor, wrestler and Member of Parliament (2003–2007), suicide by gunshot.
Raymond Kamber, 79, Swiss Olympic sprint canoer.
Slavka Maneva, 75, Macedonian writer and poet.
Charles Massi, 57, Central African politician and rebel leader.
Monica Maughan, 76, Australian actress, cancer.
Jim Rimmer, 75, Canadian graphic designer, cancer.
Gladstone Robinson, 66, Jamaican cricketer.
Gerrit de Ruiter, 82, Dutch hockey player
Otmar Suitner, 87, Austrian conductor.
Hans L. Trefousse, 88, German-born American historian.
Amir Vahedi, 48, Iranian-born American poker player, complications of diabetes.
Sumner G. Whittier, 98, American politician, Lieutenant Governor of Massachusetts (1953–1957).

9
Améleté Abalo, 47, Togolese national football team assistant coach, shot.
John Ballem, 84, Canadian novelist.
Amo Bessone, 93, American ice hockey player and coach.
Juan Bidegaray, 90, Uruguayan Olympic sailor
Gösta Bredefeldt, 74, Swedish actor.
Franz-Hermann Brüner, 64, German head of OLAF, after long illness.
Acúrsio Carrelo, 78, Portuguese footballer.
Mark Ellidge, 69–70, British press photographer.
Ken Genser, 59, American politician, mayor of Santa Monica, California, after long illness.
Per N. Hagen, 73, Norwegian politician.
Rupert Hamer, 39, British journalist, defence correspondent for the Sunday Mirror, improvised explosive device.
Fatimah Hashim, 85, Malaysian politician, first female minister in the Malaysian government.
Laura Chapman Hruska, 74, American writer, co-founder and editor in chief of Soho Press, cancer.
Jack Kerness, 98, American art director, natural causes.
Nadav Levitan, 64, Israeli film director and screenwriter, lung disease.
Ronald Moore, 84, Canadian politician.
Evgeni Paladiev, 61, Soviet-born Kazakh ice hockey player.
Diether Posser, 87, German politician.
Armand Razafindratandra, 84, Malagasy cardinal, archbishop of Antananarivo (1994–2005), fall.
Vimcy, 84, Indian sports writer.
Thomas Summers West, 82, Scottish chemist.

10
Sir Donald Acheson, 83, British physician, Chief Medical Officer of England (1983–1991).
Sailadhar Baruah, 68, Indian film producer, complications of diabetes.
Mina Bern, 98, Polish-born American Yiddish theatre actor, heart failure.
Bert Bushnell, 88, British Olympic gold medal-winning rower (1948).
Carlos Bonilla Chávez, 86, Ecuadorian classical guitarist.
Simon Digby, 77, Indian-born British scholar and linguist, pancreatic cancer.
Danny Fitzgerald, 49–50, Irish hurler and Gaelic football player.
Jan C. Gabriel, 69, American race track announcer, complications from polycystic kidney disease.
Donald Goerke, 83, American executive (Campbell's Soup Company), created SpaghettiOs, heart failure.
Dick Johnson, 84, American big band clarinetist (Artie Shaw Band), after short illness.
Edward Linde, 67, American businessman, founder of Boston Properties, pneumonia.
Frances Morrell, 72, British political adviser and educationalist, cancer.
Ulf Olsson, 58, Swedish murderer, suicide by hanging.
Bill Patterson, 87, Australian racing driver, natural causes.
Jayne Walton Rosen, 92, American singer, Lawrence Welk's Champagne Lady (1940–1945), natural causes.
Moisés Saba, 47, Mexican entrepreneur, helicopter crash.
Dale Shewalter, 59, American teacher, founder of the Arizona Trail, cancer.
Mano Solo, 46, French singer, ruptured aneurysm.
Crispin Sorhaindo, 78, Dominican politician, President (1993–1998), cancer.
Bojidar Spiriev, 77, Bulgarian-born Hungarian hydrologist and statistician, creator of IAAF scoring tables.
Torbjørn Yggeseth, 75, Norwegian ski jumping athlete and official.

11
Juliet Anderson, 71, American pornographic actress and movie producer.
Aleksandr Androshkin, 62, Soviet Ukrainian sports shooter.
Francisco Benkö, 99, German-born Argentine chess master.
Robben Wright Fleming, 93, American president of the University of Michigan (1968–1978).
Georgy Garanian, 75, Russian jazz saxophonist and bandleader, cardiac arrest.
Dorothy Geeben, 101, American mayor of Ocean Breeze Park, Florida (since 2001), oldest active mayor in the U.S.
Miep Gies, 100, Dutch humanitarian, protector of Anne Frank during World War II, complications from a fall.
Mick Green, 65, British rock and roll guitarist (Johnny Kidd & The Pirates, Billy J. Kramer and the Dakotas).
Andis Hadjicostis, 43, Cypriot CEO of Sigma TV, shot.
Johnny King, 83, English footballer.
Kurt Liebhart, 76, Austrian Olympic sprint canoer.
Harry Männil, 89, Estonian-born Venezuelan businessman.
Bob Noorda, 82, Dutch-born Italian graphic designer.
Éric Rohmer, 89, French film director.
Joe Rollino, 104, American strongman, weightlifter, and boxer, struck by van.
Ed Scott, 92, American baseball scout.
Dennis Stock, 81, American photographer (Magnum Photos), colon and liver cancer.
Gordon Van Tol, 49, Canadian Olympic water polo player, heart attack.

12
Masoud Alimohammadi, 50, Iranian nuclear scientist, bomb blast.
Miloslav Bělonožník, 91, Czech Olympic ski jumper.
Daniel Bensaïd, 63, French philosopher and Trotskyist activist.
Ken Colbung, 78, Australian Aboriginal elder, after short illness.
Shirley Bell Cole, 89, American voice actor (Little Orphan Annie).
Miguel Ángel de la Flor, 85, Peruvian army officer and politician.
Colin Dettmer, 51, South African cricketer.
Altan Dinçer, 77, Turkish Olympic basketball player.
Krisda Arunvongse na Ayudhya, 78, Thai architect, Governor of Bangkok (1996–2001), coronary artery disease.
Fred Krone, 79, American stuntman, cancer.
Elizabeth Laverick, 85, British engineer.
Hillis Layne, 91, American Major League Baseball player (1941, 1944–1945).
Alastair Martin, 94, American tennis player, member of the Hall of Fame, President of the United States Tennis Association (1969–1970).
Sir Allen McClay, 77, British pharmaceutical company founder, cancer.
Elizabeth Moody, 70, New Zealand actress and theatre director, pneumonia.
Ann Prentiss, 70, American actress (Captain Nice, My Stepmother Is an Alien).
Art Rust, Jr., 82, American sports commentator, Parkinson's disease.
Hasib Sabbagh, 89, Palestinian businessman.
Vanda Skuratovich, 84, Belarusian Roman Catholic activist.
Vadú, 32, Cape Verdean singer, car accident.
Yabby You, 63, Jamaican reggae singer and producer, stroke.
Notable people killed in the 2010 Haiti earthquake:
Georges Anglade, 65, Haitian professor and cabinet minister, co-founder of Université du Québec à Montréal.
Hédi Annabi, 65, Tunisian diplomat, Head of MINUSTAH.
Zilda Arns, 75, Brazilian pediatrician and humanitarian.
Luiz Carlos da Costa, 60, Brazilian diplomat, Deputy Head of MINUSTAH.
Serge Marcil, 65, Canadian politician, Quebec National Assembly of Quebec (1985–1994), MP for Beauharnois—Salaberry (2000–2004).
Flo McGarrell, 35, Italian-born American artist.
Myriam Merlet, 53, Haitian political activist.
Joseph Serge Miot, 63, Haitian Roman Catholic archbishop of Port-au-Prince.
Jimmy O, 35, Haitian hip hop musician.

13
Jack Block, 85, American psychologist, complications of a spinal cord injury.
Edward Brinton, 86, American marine biologist, after long illness.
Sir Robin Maxwell-Hyslop, 78, British politician, MP for Tiverton (1960–1992).
Abdullah Mehdar, Yemeni al-Qaeda terrorist, shot.
Teddy Pendergrass, 59, American soul singer, complications from colorectal cancer.
Jay Reatard, 29, American garage punk musician, cocaine toxicity.
Tommy Sloan, 84, Scottish footballer (Hearts, Motherwell).
Isamu Tanonaka, 77, Japanese voice actor (GeGeGe no Kitaro), heart attack.
Ed Thigpen, 79, American jazz drummer, after long illness.
Edgar Vos, 78, Dutch fashion designer, heart attack.

14
Ante Babaja, 82, Croatian film director and screenwriter.
Bobby Charles, 71, American songwriter ("See You Later, Alligator", "(I Don't Know Why) But I Do").
Antonio Fontán, 86, Spanish politician and journalist.
Micha Gaillard, Haitian politician, earthquake.
John F. Hayes, 90, American attorney and politician, Kansas House of Representatives (1953–1955; 1967–1979).
Mark Jones, 70, British actor (The Empire Strikes Back, Doctor Who, Buccaneer).
Guðmundur Lárusson, 84, Icelandic Olympic sprinter.
Charles Nolte, 86, American actor, playwright and educator, prostate cancer.
Otto, 20, British dachshund-terrier, world's oldest dog, euthanised following stomach tumour.
P. K. Page, 93, Canadian poet.
Chilton Price, 96, American songwriter ("Slow Poke", "You Belong to Me").
Phoebe Prince, 15, Irish student at South Hadley High School, Massachusetts, bullying victim, suicide by hanging.
Marika Rivera, 90, French actress, daughter of Diego Rivera.
James W. Rutherford, 84, American mayor of Flint, Michigan (1975–1983, 2002–2003).
Katharina Rutschky, 68, German educationalist and author.
Petra Schürmann, 74, German television presenter, Miss World 1956, after long illness.
Jessie Tait, 81, British ceramic designer.
Antonio Vilaplana Molina, 83, Spanish Roman Catholic Bishop of León (1987–2002), renal failure. 
Bernie Voorheis, 87, American basketball player.
Rowland Wolfe, 95, American Olympic gold medal-winning (1932) gymnast.

15
Asim Butt, 31, Pakistani artist (Stuckism art movement), suicide by hanging.
Florence-Marie Cooper, 69, American federal judge, District Court for Central District of California (since 1999), lymphoma.
Michael Creeth, 85, British biochemist.
Bahman Jalali, 65, Iranian photographer, pancreatic cancer.
Detlev Lauscher, 57, German footballer.
Steve Lovelady, 66, American Pulitzer Prize-winning journalist, throat cancer.
Mike Osborn, 92, British military officer.
Marshall Warren Nirenberg, 82, American biochemist and geneticist, Nobel Prize laureate (1968), cancer.
Peter Thomson, 73, Australian Anglican theologian, mentor to Tony Blair.

16
Glen Bell, 86, American entrepreneur, founder of Taco Bell.
Judi Chamberlin, 65, American anti-psychiatry activist, lung disease.
Guy Day, 79, American advertising executive.
Sam Dixon, 60, American minister, Deputy General Secretary of UMCOR (since 2007), earthquake.
Robert Gerard, 89, Belgian footballer 
Musa Inuwa, 62, Nigerian politician.
George Jellinek, 90, American radio personality (WQXR).
Felice Quinto, 80, Italian photographer.
Takumi Shibano, 83, Japanese novelist, pneumonia.
Carl Smith, 82, American country singer-songwriter (Hey Joe), after long illness.
Bernie Weintraub, 76, American talent agent, co-founder of the Paradigm Talent Agency.
Jimmy Wyble, 87, American guitarist, heart failure.
Katsuhisa Shibata, 66, Japanese professional wrestler, heart failure.

17
Gaines Adams, 26, American football player (Chicago Bears, Tampa Bay Buccaneers), cardiac arrest.
Maki Asakawa, 67, Japanese singer, heart failure.
Jyoti Basu, 95, Indian politician, Chief Minister of West Bengal (1977–2000), complications from pneumonia.
Thomas F. Cowan, 82, American politician, New Jersey State Senator (1984–1994).
Daisuke Gōri, 57, Japanese voice actor (Dragon Ball, Kinnikuman, Mobile Suit Gundam), suicide by wrist cutting.
Béla Köpeczi, 88, Hungarian historian and politician, Minister of Education (1982–1988).
Michalis Papakonstantinou, 91, Greek politician and author, Minister for Foreign Affairs (1992–1993).
Erich Segal, 72, American professor, author (Love Story), and screenwriter (Yellow Submarine), heart attack.

18
Ghulam Rabbani Agro, 76, Pakistani writer.
K. S. Ashwath, 84, Indian actor, multiple organ failure.
Cyril Burke, 84, Australian rugby union player.
Herb Grosch, 91, Canadian-born American computer scientist.
Kate McGarrigle, 63, Canadian folk singer, clear-cell sarcoma.
Günter Mielke, 67, German Olympic athlete.
Gladys Morcom, 91, British Olympic swimmer.
Imari Obadele, 79, American black separatist, stroke.
Reha Oğuz Türkkan, 90, Turkish writer.  
Kevin O'Shea, 62, Canadian ice hockey player (St. Louis Blues, Buffalo Sabres).
Robert B. Parker, 77, American detective writer (Spenser series, Jesse Stone novels), heart attack.
Jörgen Philip-Sörensen, 71, Danish businessman, after long illness.
Robert D. Rowley, 68, American Episcopal Bishop of Northwestern Pennsylvania (1991–2007).
Josephus Tethool, 75, Indonesian Roman Catholic Auxiliary Bishop of Amboina (1982–2009).
Celestino Tugot, 99, Filipino golfer, winner of the Philippine Open (1949, 1955–1958, 1962), lung cancer.

19
Mahmoud al-Mabhouh, 50, Palestinian leader of the Izz ad-Din al-Qassam Brigades, murdered.
Frances Buss Buch, 92, American first female television director.
Christos Chatziskoulidis, 58, Greek footballer (Egaleo F.C.), cancer.
Ian Christie, 82, British jazz clarinetist.
Tom Cochran, 85, American football player (Washington Redskins).
Dan Fitzgerald, 67, American college basketball coach (Gonzaga).
Vladimir Karpov, 87, Russian writer, Chairman of the USSR Union of Writers (1986–1991).
Jennifer Lyon, 37, American reality TV personality (Survivor: Palau), breast cancer.
Ida Mae Martinez, 78, American professional wrestler.
Bill McLaren, 86, Scottish rugby union commentator.
Panajot Pano, 70, Albanian footballer.
Cerge Remonde, 51, Filipino journalist and politician, heart attack.
Kalthoum Sarrai, 47, Tunisian-born French television presenter (Supernanny), cancer.
William Vitarelli, 99, American educator and architect.

20
Enid Campbell, 77, Australian legal scholar.
Tony Cummins, 103, Irish Roman Catholic priest.
Patricia Donoho Hughes, 79, American First Lady of Maryland (1979–1987), wife of Harry Hughes, Parkinson's disease.
John S. Loisel, 89, American fighter ace.
Calvin Maglinger, 85, American painter.
Bob Minton, 63, American-born Irish banker, critic of Scientology, heart ailment.
John Francis Moore, 68, Nigerian Roman Catholic Bishop of Bauchi (since 2003).
Jack Parry, 86, Welsh footballer (Swansea Town, Ipswich Town, Wales).
John Pawle, 94, English cricketer.
Derek Prag, 86, British politician, MEP for Hertfordshire (1979–1994).
Wallace Michael Ross, 89, British organist and choirmaster.
Abraham Sutzkever, 96, Polish-born Israeli poet.
Lynn Taitt, 75, Jamaican reggae guitarist, cancer.

21
Sayeed Ahmed, 79, Bangladeshi playwright.
Orhan Alp, 90, Turkish engineer and politician.
Bobby Bragan, 92, American baseball player and manager, heart attack.
Irwin Dambrot, 81, American basketball player involved in the CCNY Point Shaving Scandal, Parkinson's disease.
Lawrence Garfinkel, 88, American epidemiologist, cardiovascular disease.
Knud Gleie, 74, Danish Olympic swimmer.
Larry Johnson, 62, American film producer, heart attack.
Chindodi Leela, 72, Indian theatre and film actress, complications from heart attack.
Robert "Squirrel" Lester, 67, American smooth soul tenor (The Chi-Lites), liver cancer.
Hal Manders, 92, American baseball player (Detroit Tigers).
Jacques Martin, 88, French comics artist and writer.
Camille Maurane, 98, French baritone singer.
Guillermo Abadía Morales, 97, Colombian folklore researcher, indigenous language expert, natural causes.
Curt Motton, 69, American baseball player, stomach cancer.
Paul Quarrington, 56, Canadian novelist, musician and screenwriter, lung cancer.

22
Apache, 45, American rapper, after long illness.
Lenna Arnold, 89, American baseball player (AAGPBL)
Donnis Churchwell, 73, American football player.
Sir Percy Cradock, 86, British diplomat, after short illness.
Sir Dermot de Trafford, 85, British aristocrat and businessman.
Clayton Gerein, 45, Canadian wheelchair sports athlete, seven-time Paralympian, brain tumor.
Claus Gerson, 92, American Olympic hockey player.
Louis R. Harlan, 87, American Pulitzer Prize-winning historian, after long illness.
Iskandar of Johor, 77, Malaysian Yang di-Pertuan Agong (1984–1989), Sultan of Johor (1981–2010).
Jennifer Lyn Jackson, 40, American Playboy model, drug overdose.
Andrew E. Lange, 52, American astrophysicist, Big Bang researcher, suicide by asphyxiation.
Juan Pedro Laporte, 64, Guatemalan archaeologist.
Janeshwar Mishra, 76, Indian politician, cardiac arrest.
James Mitchell, 89, American actor (All My Children), chronic obstructive pulmonary disease.
Private Terms, 25, American Thoroughbred racehorse, euthanized.
Gordon Richardson, Baron Richardson of Duntisbourne, 94, British Governor of the Bank of England (1973–1983).
Godfrey A. Rockefeller, 85, American aviator and conservationist.
Johnny Seven, 83, American actor (Ironside), lung cancer.
Jean Simmons, 80, British-born American actress (Hamlet, Spartacus), lung cancer.
Ruth P. Smith, 102, American pro-choice campaigner.
Tuanaitau F. Tuia, 89, American Samoan politician and legislator, longest serving member of the American Samoa Fono.
Betty Wilson, 88, Australian cricketer.
Tom Wittum, 60, American football player (San Francisco 49ers), cancer.

23
George C. Baldwin, 92, American physicist.
Haren S. Gandhi, 68, Indian-born American inventor and engineer.
Robert Lam, 64, Malaysian news presenter, skin cancer.
Douglas J. Martin, 82, New Zealand leader in the LDS Church.
Sam Match, 87, American tennis player.
Roger Pierre, 86, French actor (Mon oncle d'Amérique), cancer.
Sir Thomas Prickett, 96, British RAF Air Chief Marshal.
Kermit Tyler, 96, American pilot, figured in the attack on Pearl Harbor, complications from strokes.
Oleg Velyky, 32, Ukrainian-born German handball player, melanoma.
Earl Wild, 94, American classical pianist, heart failure.

24
Boydson Baird, 91, American basketball player.
Lawrence Aloysius Burke, 77, Jamaican Roman Catholic Archbishop of Kingston (2004–2008), Nassau (1981–2004), cancer.
Thomas Cullinan, 63, South African cricketer.
Donald Dowd, 87, American campaign aide to the Kennedy family.
*Ghazali Shafie, 87, Malaysian politician, Home Minister (1973–1981) and Foreign Minister (1981–1984).
Irshad Ahmed Haqqani, 81, Pakistani journalist and politician.
Robert Mosbacher, 82, American politician, Secretary of Commerce (1989–1992), pancreatic cancer.
Leonid Nechayev, 70, Russian film director, stroke.
Jim Podoley, 76, American football player (Washington Redskins), melanoma.
James Henry Quello, 95, American government official, FCC Commissioner (1974–1997), heart and kidney failure.
FitzRoy Somerset, 5th Baron Raglan, 82, British aristocrat.
Pernell Roberts, 81, American actor (Bonanza; Trapper John, M.D.), pancreatic cancer.
Peter Wood, 74, Australian politician, member of the Legislative Assembly of Queensland (1966–1974).

25
Ali Hassan al-Majid, 68, Iraqi military commander and government minister, execution by hanging.
Sefis Anastasakos, 68, Greek politician, author, lawyer and activist, cancer.
Lynn Bayonas, 66, Australian television writer and producer, cancer.
Orlando Cole, 101, American classical cellist and educator.
Horace Weldon Gilmore, 91, American federal judge.
Jane Jarvis, 94, American jazz pianist and organist.
Pádraig MacKernan, 69, Irish diplomat, Secretary General (Foreign Affairs), Ambassador to France and United States.
Georgiann Makropoulos, 67, American professional wrestling historian and author, heart attack.
Iivari Malmikoski, 82, Finnish Olympic boxer.
Charles Mathias, 87, American politician, Senator from Maryland (1969–1987), complications of Parkinson's disease.
Gordon Park, 66, British convicted murderer, apparent suicide by hanging.
Algirdas Petrulis, 95, Lithuanian painter.
Ivan Prenđa, 70, Croatian Roman Catholic Archbishop of Zadar (since 1990).
Bill Ritchie, 78, Scottish comic book artist.
Emilio Vieyra, 88, Argentine film director, actor, screenwriter and producer.

26
Andon Amaraich, 77, Micronesian Chief Justice of the Supreme Court, pneumonia.
Louis Auchincloss, 92, American novelist, complications of a stroke.
Juliusz Bardach, 95, Polish historian.
Boa Sr., 85, Indian Great Andamanese elder, last speaker of the Bo language.
Geoffrey Burbidge, 84, British-born American astrophysicist, after long illness.
Anne Froelick, 96, American blacklisted screenwriter.
Dag Frøland, 64, Norwegian comedian, singer and variety artist.
Gummadi, 82, Indian actor.
Paul R. Jones, 81, American art collector, after short illness.
Eugenijus Karpavičius, 56, Lithuanian illustrator.
Inda Ledesma, 83, Argentine actress, cardiac arrest.
Ajmer Singh, 69, Indian athlete and educator.
Paul Mbiybe Verdzekov, 79, Cameroonian Roman Catholic Archbishop of Bamenda (1970–2006).
Ken Walters, 76, American baseball player (Philadelphia Phillies).

27
Harry Alger, 85, Canadian politician.
Lee Archer, 90, American Air Force pilot (Tuskegee Airman).
Barry Blitzer, 80, American television writer (Gomer Pyle, U.S.M.C., The Flintstones, The Jetsons), complications from abdominal surgery.
Betty Lou Keim, 71, American actress, lung cancer.
Ruben Kruger, 39, South African rugby union player, brain tumor.
Eduardo Michaelsen, 89, Cuban exile, painter in the naive art style.
Shirley Collie Nelson, 78, American country singer, ex-wife of Willie Nelson.
Zelda Rubinstein, 76, American actress (Poltergeist, Picket Fences), natural causes.
J. D. Salinger, 91, American author (The Catcher in the Rye), natural causes.
Howard Zinn, 87, American historian (A People's History of the United States), civil rights and anti-war activist, heart attack.

28
A.K.M. Mohiuddin Ahmed, Bangladesh Army officer, hanged.
Mohammad-Reza Ali-Zamani, c. 38, Iranian activist, hanging.
Frank Baker Jr., 66, American baseball player (Cleveland Indians), heart failure.
Larbi Belkheir, 72, Algerian major general, Interior Minister (1991).
Bill Binder, 94, American restaurateur (Phillippe's).
Eduardo Catalano, 92, Argentine architect.
Patricia Clarke, 90, British biochemist.
José Eugênio Corrêa, 95, Brazilian Roman Catholic Bishop of Caratinga (1957–1978).
Margaret Dale, 87, British dancer and television director.
Walter Fondren, 73, American football player and conservationist, heart failure.
George Hanlon, 92, Australian horse trainer, three-time Melbourne Cup winner, natural causes.
Mick Higgins, 87, Irish Gaelic footballer, All-Ireland Senior Football Championship winner (Cavan; 1947, 1948, 1952).
Wilfriede Hoffmann, 77, German Olympic athlete.
Mohammad Bazlul Huda, Bangladeshi army officer and assassin of Sheikh Mujibur Rahman, hanged.
Alistair Hulett, 57, Scottish-born Australian folk singer, liver failure.
Robert Joffe, 66, American lawyer, pancreatic cancer.
Patricia Leonard, 73, British contralto, throat cancer.
Kazimierz Mijal, 99, Polish politician.
Bud Millikan, 89, American basketball coach (University of Maryland).
Sarah Mulvey, 34, British television producer (Channel 4), suspected suicide.
Arash Rahmanipour, c. 20, Iranian activist, hanging.
Seymour Sarason, 91, American psychologist.
Keiko Tobe, 52, Japanese manga artist (With the Light), mesothelioma.

29
Evgeny Agranovich, 91, Russian composer and bard.
Elsa Bakalar, 90–91, English-born American garden designer.
Tom Brookshier, 78, American football player (Philadelphia Eagles), coach and sportscaster (CBS Sports, WCAU), cancer.
Adam Alexander Dawson, 96, British film editor.
Eric Freiwald, 82, American television writer (The Young and the Restless).
Georgelle Hirliman, 73, American performance artist, cancer.
Sir Derek Hodgkinson, 92, British air chief marshal.
Tom Howard, 59, American musician, heart attack.
Ralph McInerny, 80, American philosopher (University of Notre Dame) and mystery author (Father Dowling Mysteries).
Ram Niwas Mirdha, 85, Indian politician (Lok Sabha), minister and speaker (Rajasthan Legislative Assembly), multiple organ dysfunction syndrome.
Wilf Paish, 77, British athletics coach, after long illness.
Mikael Reuterswärd, 45, Swedish adventurer, first Swede to reach summit of Mount Everest (body found on this date).
Karen Schmeer, 39, American documentary film editor (The Fog of War), vehicular hit-and-run.
Zahid Sheikh, 60, Pakistani Olympic silver medal-winning (1972) field hockey player.
Cameron Snyder, 93, American sports journalist (The Baltimore Sun), won Dick McCann Memorial Award (1982), lung cancer.
Eckart Viehweg, 61, German mathematician, after short illness.

30
Rafet Angın, 94, Turkish teacher.
Erna Baumbauer, 91, German casting agent.
Ruth Cohn, 97, German psychotherapist.
Lucienne Day, 93, British textile designer.
Ron Giles, 90, English cricketer (Nottinghamshire).
Sølve Grotmol, 70, Norwegian sports commentator.
Bruce Mitchell, 90, Australian academic.
Ursula Mommens, 101, British potter.
Brahmananda Panda, 61, Indian politician.
Guy Renwick, 73, British Olympic bobsledder.
Aaron Ruben, 95, American television producer (Andy Griffith Show, Gomer Pyle U.S.M.C., Sanford and Son), pneumonia.
Tan Eng Yoon, 82, Singaporean Olympic sprinter.

31
Gunnar Aksnes, 83, Norwegian chemist and poet.
Kage Baker, 57, American science fiction and fantasy author, uterine cancer.
Pauly Fuemana, 40, New Zealand musician (OMC), after short illness.
Henry Fukuhara, 96, American watercolor painter, natural causes.
Patricia Gage, 69, British actress and voice actress.
Jiří Havlis, 77, Czech Olympic gold medal-winning (1952) rower.
Albert Huie, 89, Jamaican painter.
Edith Josie, 88, Canadian columnist, natural causes.
Viktor Kaisiepo, 61, Netherlands New Guinean-born Dutch activist for West Papuan independence.
Thorleif Karlsen, 100, Norwegian police inspector, politician and radio host, natural causes.
Sanna Kiero, 79, Finnish Olympic cross-country skier.
Howard Lotsof, 66, American researcher, discovered anti-addictive effects of ibogaine, liver cancer.
Tomás Eloy Martínez, 75, Argentine writer and journalist, brain tumor.
Shizuka Miura, Japanese ball-jointed doll maker and musician, suicide.
John Norris, 76, British-born Canadian publisher (Coda), heart condition.
Keith Norton, 69, Canadian politician, former MPP for Kingston and the Islands (1975–1985), cancer.
Paddie O'Neil, 83, British actress and singer.
Phil Smith, 63, Australian football player, cancer.
Pierre Vaneck, 78, French actor (The Science of Sleep), complications of heart surgery.

References

2010-01
 01